Shūta, Shuta or Shuuta (written: , , ,  or ) is a masculine Japanese given name. Notable people with the name include:

, Japanese footballer
, Japanese footballer
, Japanese singer, actor and dancer
, Japanese footballer
, Japanese former professional baseball player
, Japanese professional baseball player
, Japanese boxer

Japanese masculine given names